Although not technically a derby, the fixture between IFK Göteborg and Malmö FF is one of the fiercest sporting rivalries in Swedish football, sometimes referred to as the "Mesta mästarmötet".

The two clubs are the most successful in Swedish football; Malmö FF have won 22 Swedish championship titles, an all time Swedish record, while IFK Göteborg have won 18 titles. 

The two clubs top the All-time Allsvenskan table with Malmö FF being 143 points ahead of IFK Göteborg after the conclusion of the 2021 season. Together they have won 40 Swedish championships, 38 Allsvenskan titles and 23 Svenska Cupen titles. Only AIK have played more seasons in Allsvenskan than the two clubs.

The two clubs are also the only Swedish clubs to have reached the final of European competition, IFK Göteborg won the UEFA Cup in 1981–82 and again in 1986–87 while Malmö FF were runners-up in the 1978–79 European Cup.

Shared player history

Transfers
The two lists are incomplete.

There have been few direct transfers between the rivals, the most recent transfer was on 12 January 2018.

There have also been a few players who have played for both clubs although transferred via another club.

Played for one, managed the other

Managed both clubs

1 Only competitive matches are counted.

Statistics

Table correct as of 25 April 2022

Last five head-to-head fixtures

Honours

Table correct as of 26 May 2022

All-time results

IFK Göteborg in the league at home

Malmö FF in the league at home

1 Awarded 0-3 after the original match had been suspended with the score at a 0–0 as a result of a spectator scandal.

2 The match was played behind closed doors due to the COVID-19 pandemic in Sweden.
3 The match was played with limited capacity due to the COVID-19 pandemic in Sweden.

Results at home in Cup matches

1 The match was played behind closed doors due to the COVID-19 pandemic in Sweden.

Results at neutral venues

References

Bibliography

Notes

External links
 Sveriges Fotbollshistoriker och Statistiker – Statistics for all Allsvenskan and Svenska Cupen matches
 IFK Göteborg official website
 Malmö FF official website

IFK Göteborg
Malmö FF
Football derbies in Sweden